Farfugium japonicum (syn. Ligularia tussilaginea) is a species of flowering plant in the family Asteraceae, also known as leopard plant, green leopard plant or tractor seat plant. It is native to streams and seashores of Japan, where it is called tsuwabuki (石蕗).

Description

Cultivation
Farfugium japonicum is grown as an ornamental plant for garden planting and containers. The variegated cultivars are often used to brighten shade garden settings. Farfugium japonicum var. giganteum is a very large leaved selection. Some cultivars have shiny green leaves variegated with irregular creamy white or yellow markings, which are leathery and large, 4-10 in (10.2-25.4 cm) across, with wavy or toothed margins, held aloft on long stalks. Others are an even green without the white or yellow markings.

The cultivar 'Aureomaculatum' has gained the Royal Horticultural Society's Award of Garden Merit. It is hardy in coastal or mild areas, but requires protection from cold winds.

Toxicity
Farfugium japonicum contains tumorigenic pyrrolizidine alkaloids.

Gallery

References

External links

Floridata entry
Missouri Botanical Garden - Horticulture treatment: Farfugium japonicum var. giganteum (Giant leopard plant)

Senecioneae
Flora of Japan
Garden plants of Asia
Perennial plants
Flora of China